Euthenia (Eustheneia) was the ancient Greek female spirit of prosperity. Her opposite was Penia and her sisters entailed Eucleia, Philophrosyne, and Eupheme. Along with her siblings, she was regarded as a member of the younger Charites. According to the Orphic fragments, her parents were Hephaestus and Aglaea.

She is also a part of the Egyptian and Roman pantheon. During Ptolemaic times, she became the consort of Nilus. Her first appearance on Egyptian coins date back to the last decade of BC.

On Roman coins, Euthenia is often compared to Abundantia, the personification of abundance and prosperity, and Annona, the personification of the grain supply to Rome.

References

Personifications in Greek mythology
Greek goddesses
Children of Hephaestus